Chicago, the third-largest city in the United States, is home to 1,397 completed high-rises, 56 of which stand taller than . The tallest building in the city is the 110-story Willis Tower (formerly the Sears Tower), which rises  in the Chicago Loop and was completed in 1974. Sears Tower was the tallest building in the world upon its completion, and remained the tallest building in the United States until May 10, 2013. The second, third, and fourth-tallest buildings in Chicago are the Trump International Hotel & Tower, St Regis Chicago, and the Aon Center, respectively. Of the ten tallest buildings in the United States, two are located in Chicago. Of the fifteen tallest buildings in the United States, five are in Chicago. Chicago has the second tallest skyline in the United States after New York City. Chicago leads the nation in the twenty tallest women-designed towers in the world, thanks to contributions by Jeanne Gang and Natalie de Blois.

Chicago is the birthplace of the skyscraper. The Home Insurance Building, completed in 1885, is regarded as the world's first skyscraper. This building used the steel-frame method, innovated in Chicago. The building was demolished in 1931. New York City then began building skyscrapers as Chicago had done, and the two cities were virtually the only cities in the world with huge skylines for many decades. Chicago has always played a prominent role in the development of skyscrapers and three past buildings have been the tallest building in the United States. Being the inventor of the skyscraper, Chicago went through a very early high-rise construction boom that lasted from the early 1920s to the late 1930s, during which 9 of the city's 100 tallest buildings were constructed. The city then went through an even larger building boom that has lasted from the early 1960s. The tallest buildings are concentrated in various downtown districts such as the Loop, Streeterville, River North, the South Loop, and the West Loop. Other high-rises extend north along the waterfront into North Side districts such as the Gold Coast, Lincoln Park, Lakeview, Uptown and Edgewater. Some high-rises also extend south from downtown along the waterfront to South Side districts such as Kenwood, Hyde Park, and South Shore.

Several new skyscrapers were constructed in the city throughout the 2000s and 2010s, including the Trump International Hotel and Tower, St Regis Chicago, NEMA Chicago, and Aqua. As of January 2021, there were 19 skyscrapers proposed or under construction, including One Chicago Square, 1000M, and Bank of America Tower, as well as Tribune Tower East, an approved skyscraper set to become the city's second tallest building.



Tallest buildings
This height includes spires and architectural details but does not include antenna masts. An equal sign (=) following a rank indicates the same height between two or more buildings. The "Year" column indicates the year of completion.

Tallest buildings by pinnacle height
This list ranks Chicago skyscrapers based on their pinnacle height, which includes radio masts and antennas. Standard architectural height measurement, which excludes antennas in building height, is included for comparative purposes. The "Year" column indicates the year in which a building was completed.

Tallest under construction or proposed

Under construction
This lists buildings that are under construction in Chicago and are planned to rise at least . Buildings whose construction is on-hold are also included. A floor count of 30 stories is used as the cutoff for buildings whose heights have not yet been released by their developers. The "Year" category denotes when the building is expected to be completed.

Approved and proposed
This lists buildings that are proposed for construction in Chicago and that are planned to rise at least . A floor count of 50 stories is used as the cutoff for buildings whose heights have not yet been released by their developers. The "Year" category denotes when construction of the building is expected to begin.

Cancelled
This lists buildings designed to rise at least  that were approved for construction in Chicago but were cancelled prior to completion. This list does not include vision projects such as Gateway Tower or the Miglin-Beitler Skyneedle, nor does it include projects that were not approved by the Chicago Plan Commission such as the Waldorf-Astoria Hotel and Residence Tower.

Timeline of tallest buildings

See also

 Architecture of Chicago
 List of Chicago Landmarks
 List of cities with most skyscrapers
 List of tallest buildings in the United States
 List of buildings with over 100 floors

Notes
 A. This building was destroyed by the Great Chicago Fire in 1871, and replaced by the current cathedral of the same name in 1875.
 B. The clock tower on this building was removed in 1895, allowing a shorter building to become the tallest in the city.
 C. The Masonic Temple, built in 1892, became the tallest in Chicago three years later when the Board of Trade Building had its clock tower removed.

References
 General
 
 Specific

External links
 Diagram of Chicago skyscrapers on SkyscraperPage.com

 
Chicago
Tallest Buildings in Chicago
Tallest in Chicago